Guan Tong may refer to:

 Guan Tong (Shu Han), state official in the Shu Han dynasty
 Guan Tong (painter) (c. 906-960), Chinese landscape painter